Petroleum Act (with its variations) is a stock short title used internationally for legislation relating to petroleum.

List

Bahamas 

 The Petroleum Act 1971

Bangladesh 

 The Petroleum Act 1934

India 

 The Petroleum Act 1934

Iran 

 The Petroleum Act 1987

Ireland 

 The Petroleum and Other Minerals Development Act 1960

Jamaica 

 The Petroleum Act 1979

Kenya 

 The Petroleum Act 2019

Malawi 

 The Petroleum (Exploration and Production) Act 1984

Malaysia
The Petroleum Development Act 1974
The Petroleum and Electricity (Control of Supplies) Act 1974
The Petroleum (Income Tax) Act 1967
The Petroleum Mining Act 1966
The Petroleum (Safety Measures) Act 1984

New Zealand 

 The Petroleum Act 1937

Nigeria 

 The Petroleum Act 1969

Norway 

 The Petroleum Act 1996

Thailand 

 The Petroleum Act 1971

Trinidad and Tobago 

 The Petroleum Act 1969

United Kingdom
The Petroleum Act 1998 (c 17)
The Petroleum Royalties (Relief) and Continental Shelf Act 1989 (c 1)
The Petroleum Act 1987 (c 12) 
The Advance Petroleum Revenue Tax Act 1986 (c 68) 
The Petroleum Royalties (Relief) Act 1983 (c 59) 
The Petroleum Revenue Tax Act 1980 (c 1)  
The Petroleum and Submarine Pipe-lines Act 1975 (c 74) 
The Offshore Petroleum Development (Scotland) Act 1975 (c 8) 
The Petroleum (Production) Act (Northern Ireland) 1964 (c 28) (NI) 
The Petroleum (Transfer of Licences) Act (Northern Ireland) 1937 (c 4) (NI)
The Petroleum (Transfer of Licences) Act 1936 (26 Geo 5 & 1 Edw 8 c 27) 
The Petroleum (Production) Act 1934 (24 & 25 Geo 5 c 36) 
The Petroleum (Consolidation) Act (Northern Ireland) 1929 (c 13) (NI) 
The Petroleum (Consolidation) Act 1928 (18 & 19 Geo 5 c 32)
The Petroleum (Amendment) Act 1928 (18 & 19 Geo 5 c 20)
The Petroleum Act 1926 (16 & 17 Geo 5 c 25)
The Petroleum (Production) Act 1918 (8 & 9 Geo 5 c 52)
The Petroleum Act 1868 (31 & 32 Vict c 56)
The Petroleum Act 1862 (26 & 27 Vict c 66
The Petroleum Acts 1871 to 1881 was the collective title of the following Acts:
The Petroleum Act 1871 (34 & 35 Vict c 105)
The Petroleum Act 1879 (42 & 43 Vict c 47)
The Petroleum (Hawkers) Act 1881 (44 & 45 Vict c 67)

Zambia 

 The Petroleum Act 1930

See also
List of short titles

References

Lists of legislation by short title